Mullaney is a surname of Irish origin (from Connacht). It is an Anglicised form of the Gaelic Ó Maoil Sheanaigh meaning "descendant of Maoilsheanaigh". The Gaelic personal name Maoilsheanaigh means "devotee of (Saint) Seanach" and the personal name Seanach is made up of the element sean meaning "ancient", "old". Many spellings of Connacht named omit the Sh and in consequence one theory is that Mullaney may be an Anglicisation of Ó Maoileanaigh "descendant of Maoileanach". The personal name Maoileanach means "chief of the marsh". An Ulster family, unrelated to the Connacht family, bore the name Ó Maoileanaigh.

People
 Beatrice Hancock Mullaney (????-1990), American jurist
 Craig Mullaney (born 1978), American veteran and author
 Dean Mullaney (born 1954), American editor
 Dominick F. Mullaney (1854–1929), American politician
 Jack Mullaney (1929-1982), American actor
 Jake Mullaney (born 1990), Australian footballer
 Jim Mullaney, American writer
 Joe Mullaney (basketball) (1924-2000), American basketball player
 Joe Mullaney (actor) (born 1962), Scottish actor
 Joe Mullaney (rugby league) (c.1934), English rugby football player
 Kerry Anne Mullaney (born 1975), Scottish film director
 Kevin Mullaney (born 1954), American darts player
 Mark Mullaney (born 1953), American footballer player
 Paul V. Mullaney (1919-2017), American judge
 Richard Mullaney (born 1993), American football player
 Ryan Mullaney (born 1996), Irish hurler
 Steven Mullaney (born 1986), English cricketer
 bobby mullaney (born 1990) English footballer
 Nigel Mullaney (born 1972) Electronic Musician Film Composer

Fictional
Lloyd Mullaney, character on Coronation Street

See also
 Mullany

References